Jitti Muangkhonkaen; also known as Jitti Kiatsuriya (จิตติ เกียรติสุริยา) is a Thai former Muay Thai fighter.

Biography and career
Jitti started Muay Thai training at the age of 13 in Khon Kaen. By the time he was 18 he had made name for himself fighting in Bangkok.

Between 1975 and 1981 Jitti was considered one of the best fighters in Thailand. He defeated notable champions such as Nongkhai Sor.Prapatsorn, Samersing Tianhiran, Ruengsak Porntawee, Bundit Singprakarn, Vicharnnoi Porntawee, Wichit Lookbangplasoy, Poot Lorlek, Posai Sitiboonlert and Sagat Porntawee.

Jitti took part in the first "two against one" bout in Bangkok Muay Thai history. He teamed up with Jocky Sitkanpai, they relayed each other to fight Posai Sitiboonlert for three rounds each. They were defeated by decision.

Jitti was among the thai fighter selected to face foreign champions on at Lumpinee Stadium on September 6, 1977. He defeated the American kickboxer Earnest Hart Jr by TKO in the fourth round. At the peak of his career his purses reached 100,000 baht.

After his fighting career Jitti opened a restaurant in Bangkok.

Titles and accomplishments
 1977 Lumpinee Stadium Fighter of the Year

Fight record

|-  style="background:#fbb;"
| 1984-03-28 || Loss ||align=left| Sawainoi Daopaedriew || Rajadamnern Stadium || Bangkok, Thailand || Decision || 5 || 3:00

|-  style="background:#fbb;"
| 1983-11-03 || Loss ||align=left| Kaopong Sitchuchai || Rajadamnern Stadium || Bangkok, Thailand || Decision || 5 || 3:00

|-  style="background:#;"
| 1983 ||  ||align=left| Saengphet Sor.Suthichai || Rajadamnern Stadium || Bangkok, Thailand ||  ||  ||

|-  style="background:#;"
| 1983 ||  ||align=left| Yodchat Sor.Jitpattana || Rajadamnern Stadium || Bangkok, Thailand ||  ||  ||

|-  style="background:#fbb;"
| 1983-01-17 || Loss ||align=left| Raktae Muangsurin || Rajadamnern Stadium || Bangkok, Thailand || Decision || 5 || 3:00

|-  style="background:#fbb;"
| 1982-11-15 || Loss ||align=left| Kaopong Sitchuchai || Lumpinee Stadium || Bangkok, Thailand || Decision || 5 || 3:00

|-  style="background:#fbb;"
| 1982-05-08 || Loss ||align=left| Saengsakda Kittikasem || Lumpinee Stadium || Bangkok, Thailand || KO || 3 ||

|-  style="background:#fbb;"
| 1981-07-08 || Loss ||align=left| Tawanook Phenmongkol || Rajadamnern Stadium || Bangkok, Thailand || Decision || 5 ||3:00

|-  style="background:#fbb;"
| 1981-04-03 || Loss ||align=left| Saengsakda Kittikasem || Lumpinee Stadium || Bangkok, Thailand || KO || 3 ||

|-  style="background:#fbb;"
| 1981-03-10 || Loss ||align=left| Krongsak Sakkasem || Lumpinee Stadium || Bangkok, Thailand || Decision || 5 || 3:00

|-  style="background:#fbb;"
| 1981-01-26 || Loss ||align=left| Padejsuk Pitsanurachan || Rajadamnern Stadium || Bangkok, Thailand || Decision || 5 ||3:00

|-  style="background:#cfc;"
| 1980-09-17 ||Win ||align=left| Youssop Sor.Thanikul || || Bangkok, Thailand || Decision || 5||3:00

|-  style="background:#fbb;"
| 1980-05-22 || Loss ||align=left| Raktae Muangsurin|| Rajadamnern Stadium  || Bangkok, Thailand || KO (Punches)|| 1||

|-  style="background:#cfc;"
| 1980-03-27 ||Win ||align=left| Prawit Sritham ||  || Bangkok, Thailand || Decision || 5||3:00

|-  style="background:#cfc;"
| 1979-12-12 ||Win ||align=left| Youssop Sor.Thanikul || Rajadamnern Stadium || Bangkok, Thailand || Decision || 5||3:00

|-  style="background:#fbb;"
| 1979-11-02|| Loss ||align=left| Khaosod Sitpraprom || Lumpinee Stadium || Bangkok, Thailand || Decision ||5 ||3:00

|-  style="background:#fbb;"
| 1979-07-27|| Loss ||align=left| Kaopong Sitchuchai || Lumpinee Stadium || Bangkok, Thailand || Decision ||5 ||3:00

|-  style="background:#fbb;"
| 1979-05-25|| Loss ||align=left| Posai Sitiboonlert ||  || Bangkok, Thailand || Decision ||5 ||3:00

|-  style="background:#cfc;"
| 1979-03-03 || Win ||align=left| Sagat Porntawee || Lumpinee Stadium || Bangkok, Thailand || Decision || 5 || 3:00

|-  style="background:#fbb;"
| 1979-02-09 || Loss ||align=left| Khaosod Sitpraprom || Lumpinee Stadium || Bangkok, Thailand || Decision || 5 || 3:00

|-  style="background:#fbb;"
| 1978-12-05 || Loss ||align=left| Sagat Porntawee || Lumpinee Stadium || Bangkok, Thailand || Decision || 5 || 3:00

|-  style="background:#cfc;"
| 1978-10-10 ||Win ||align=left| Seksan Sor.Theppitak || Lumpinee Stadium || Bangkok, Thailand || Decision || 5||3:00

|-  style="background:#fbb;"
| 1978-05-04 || Loss ||align=left| Kengkaj Kiatkriengkrai|| Rajadamnern Stadium || Bangkok, Thailand || Referee Stoppage|| 5||

|-  style="background:#fbb;"
| 1978-03-29 || Loss ||align=left| Narongnoi Kiatbandit ||Rajadamnern Stadium || Bangkok, Thailand || Decision || 5||3:00

|-  style="background:#cfc;"
| 1978-02-24 || Win ||align=left| Vicharnnoi Porntawee || Lumpinee Stadium || Bangkok, Thailand || Decision || 5 || 3:00

|-  style="background:#cfc;"
| 1977-12-06 || Win ||align=left| Nongkhai Sor.Prapatsorn || Lumpinee Stadium || Bangkok, Thailand || Decision || 5 || 3:00

|-  style="background:#cfc;"
| 1977-11-05 || Win ||align=left| Kraipetch Sor.Prateep || || Roi Et, Thailand || Decision || 5 || 3:00

|-  style="background:#fbb;"
| 1977-10-18 || Loss ||align=left| Narongnoi Kiatbandit || Lumpinee Stadium || Bangkok, Thailand || Decision || 5||3:00
|-
! style=background:white colspan=9 |
|-  style="background:#cfc;"
| 1977-09-06 || Win||align=left| Earnest Hart Jr. || Lumpinee Stadium || Bangkok, Thailand || TKO (retirement) || 4 ||

|-  style="background:#cfc;"
| 1977-07-29 || Win ||align=left| Ruengsak Porntawee || Lumpinee Stadium || Bangkok, Thailand || Decision || 5 || 3:00

|-  style="background:#cfc;"
| 1977-05-27 || Win ||align=left| Posai Sitiboonlert || Lumpinee Stadium || Bangkok, Thailand || Ref. Stop. (lack of combativity) || 4 ||

|-  style="background:#cfc;"
| 1977-04-08 || Win ||align=left| Poot Lorlek || Lumpinee Stadium || Bangkok, Thailand || Decision || 5 || 3:00

|-  style="background:#cfc;"
| 1977-03-11 || Win ||align=left| Wichit Lookbangplasoy ||Lumpinee Stadium || Bangkok, Thailand || Decision || 5 || 3:00

|-  style="background:#fbb;"
| 1977-02-04 || Loss ||align=left| Posai Sitiboonlert || 2 vs 1 Lumpinee Stadium  || Bangkok, Thailand || Decision  || 6 || 3:00
|-
! style=background:white colspan=9 |

|-  style="background:#cfc;"
| 1976-12-07 || Win ||align=left| Ruengsak Porntawee || Lumpinee Stadium || Bangkok, Thailand || Decision || 5 || 3:00

|-  style="background:#fbb;"
| 1976-11-02 || Loss ||align=left| Posai Sitiboonlert ||Lumpinee Stadium || Bangkok, Thailand || Decision || 5 || 3:00

|-  style="background:#cfc;"
| 1976-09-27 || Win ||align=left| Vicharnnoi Porntawee || Lumpinee Stadium || Bangkok, Thailand || Decision || 5 || 3:00

|-  style="background:#cfc;"
| 1976-07-08 || Win ||align=left| Bundit Singprakarn || Rajadamnern Stadium || Bangkok, Thailand || Decision || 5 ||3:00

|-  style="background:#cfc;"
| 1976-05-27 || Win ||align=left| Wangwon Lukmatulee || Rajadamnern Stadium || Bangkok, Thailand || Decision || 5 ||3:00

|-  style="background:#fbb;"
| 1976-04-06 || Loss ||align=left| Nongkhai Sor.Prapatsorn || Lumpinee Stadium || Bangkok, Thailand || Decision || 5 || 3:00

|-  style="background:#cfc;"
| 1976-03-10 || Win ||align=left| Wangwon Lukmatulee || Rajadamnern Stadium || Bangkok, Thailand || Decision || 5 || 3:00

|-  style="background:#cfc;"
| 1976-01-30 || Win ||align=left| Ruengsak Porntawee || Huamark Stadium || Bangkok, Thailand || KO (High Kick)|| 2 ||

|-  style="background:#cfc;"
| 1975-11-12 || Win||align=left| Samersing Tianhiran || Rajadamnern Stadium || Bangkok, Thailand || Decision || 5 || 3:00

|-  style="background:#fbb;"
| 1975-10-08 || Loss ||align=left| Ruengsak Porntawee || Lumpinee Stadium || Bangkok, Thailand || Decision || 5 || 3:00

|-  style="background:#cfc;"
| 1975-09-18 || Win ||align=left| Jintadej Sakniran || Lumpinee Stadium || Bangkok, Thailand || Decision || 5 || 3:00

|-  style="background:#cfc;"
| 1975-08-21 || Win ||align=left| Nongkhai Sor.Prapatsorn || Rajadamnern Stadium  || Bangkok, Thailand || Decision || 5 || 3:00

|-  style="background:#cfc;"
| 1975-07-15 || Win ||align=left| Adam Sor.Or.Nor || WBC Saensak vs Perico Fernandez, Huamark Stadium || Bangkok, Thailand || Decision || 5 || 3:00

|-  style="background:#cfc;"
| 1975-06-06 || Win ||align=left| Sangpetch Sor.Sutthichai || Lumpinee Stadium || Bangkok, Thailand || Decision || 5 || 3:00

|-  style="background:#cfc;"
| 1975-05-01 || Win ||align=left| Yodchat Sor.Chitpattana || Rajadamnern Stadium || Bangkok, Thailand || Decision || 5 || 3:00

|-  style="background:#cfc;"
| 1975-04-01 || Win ||align=left| Chansak Singwattana || Lumpinee Stadium || Bangkok, Thailand || Decision || 5 || 3:00

|-  style="background:#cfc;"
| 1975-02-28 || Win ||align=left| Ratchasak Sor Sawangthit ||  || Samrong, Thailand || Decision || 5 || 3:00

|-  style="background:#cfc;"
| 1975-01-31 || Win ||align=left| Kwannakhon Porntawee || Lumpinee Stadium || Bangkok, Thailand || Decision || 5 || 3:00

|-  style="background:#cfc;"
| 1975-01-06 || Win ||align=left| Kongburi Porntawee || Lumpinee Stadium || Bangkok, Thailand || Decision || 5 || 3:00

|-  style="background:#cfc;"
| 1974- || Win ||align=left| Ratchasak Sor Sawangthit ||  || Bangkok, Thailand || KO (High Kick)|| 2 ||

|-
| colspan=9 | Legend:

References 

1956 births
Living people
Jitti Muangkhonkaen
Jitti Muangkhonkaen